was a scholar-bureaucrat and diplomat of the Ryūkyū Kingdom. He was known for leading a movement to petition the government of Qing Dynasty China to rescue the Ryūkyū Kingdom from annexation by Imperial Japan.

Life
Rin Seikō was born in Kumemura, a community descended from Chinese immigrants in the Ryūkyū Kingdom. Having been chosen to start on the track to becoming a bureaucrat, he traveled to China to study at the age of 26, remaining at the Imperial Academy in Beijing for seven years. Upon returning to Okinawa, he was made instructor to the Crown Prince Shō Ten. Many people believed he would be elevated in position and power after King Shō Tai's death.

Worrying about the future of the Ryūkyū Kingdom, Rin Seikō left for China with Kōchi Chōjō and Sai Taitei (蔡大鼎) for help. With the Ryūkyū-kan in Fuzhou as their base, Rin and Kōchi petitioned the government of Qing Dynasty China to rescue the Ryūkyū Kingdom from annexation by Imperial Japan, but there was little response. 

Finally, Japan replaced the Ryūkyū Domain with Okinawa Prefecture on March 11, 1879. Rin Seikō went to Beijing to request that China send troops to the Ryūkyū Islands in the next year, but there was little response. Later, he heard that China had signed a peace treaty with Japan in Tianjin. Feeling hopeless, he killed himself by sword in Beijing.

References
比屋根照夫「林世功」（『沖縄大百科事典』（沖縄タイムス社、1983年））
上原兼善「林世功」（『日本歴史大事典 3』（小学館、2001年） ）

1842 births
1880 deaths
People of the Ryukyu Kingdom
Ryukyuan people of Chinese descent
Ryukyuan people
19th-century Ryukyuan people
1880s suicides